Sentence length  may refer to:
In linguistics, the length of a Sentence (linguistics)
In penology, the length of a Sentence (law)
In music, the length of a Sentence (music)